The 2006 FIBA Africa Women's Clubs Champions Cup (12th edition), was an international basketball tournament  held in Libreville, Gabon, from October 21 to 29, 2006. The tournament, organized by FIBA Africa and hosted by Somo BB, was contested by 12 clubs split into 2 groups of 6, the first four of which qualifying for the knock-out stage.
 
The tournament was won by Primeiro de Agosto from Angola.

Qualification

Draw

Squads

Preliminary rounds
Times given below are in UTC+1.

Group A

Group B

9th-12th place

Quarter finals

11th place

9th place

5th-8th place

Semifinals

7th place

5th place

Bronze medal game

Gold medal game

Final standings

Primeiro de Agosto rosterÂngela Cardoso, Astrida Vicente, Bárbara Guimarães, Bokomba Masela, Domitila Ventura, Ernestina Neto, Isabel Francisco, Jaquelina Francisco, Luísa Miguel, Luísa Tomás, Mariana Rafael, Sónia Guadalupe, Coach: Higino Garcia

All Tournament Team

See also 
 2007 FIBA Africa Championship for Women

References

External links 
 2006 FIBA Africa Champions Cup Official Website
 

2006 FIBA Africa Women's Clubs Champions Cup
2006 FIBA Africa Women's Clubs Champions Cup
2006 FIBA Africa Women's Clubs Champions Cup
FIBA